James Nolan was an Irish criminal who was convicted of rape and false imprisonment. He disappeared and his arm was subsequently found on a beach.

Background
James Nolan was from Fairlawn Park in Finglas.

Criminal history
He was convicted in 1986 of the abduction and rape of a 22-year-old woman in north Dublin. He was released in 1996, having served most of his sentence at Arbour Hill Prison.

He was jailed for burglary for 18 months in 2009. He was released on 22 November 2010.

Disappearance
He was last seen at the Wellmount Clinic in Finglas, on November 30, 2010, where he collected methadone. His parents were deceased and his family hadn't heard from him.

Arm discovered
On 8 February 2011 a severed arm was found at Dollymount Strand. A DNA sample was sent to Interpol and was subsequently identified by British police. He had been arrested in Holyhead, Wales in 2004 for using a forged driving licence and photograph. Fingerprints and DNA were taken at the time and stored in the UK’s database. State Pathologist Marie Cassidy said that the arm had been "cleanly" severed after death and tattoos had been cut from the skin to prevent identification.

Confession
In November 2016, his brother Thomas, who was living in a flat in Carrickmacross, County Monaghan, killed himself. He left a suicide note addressed to members of his family in which he confessed to have strangled James in Glasnevin Cemetery then dismembered his remains, leaving some in Tolka Park, Finglas, and some near Lough na Glack in County Monaghan. Gardaí considered the confession genuine.

Gardaí started searching Tolka Valley Park at the start of April 2017 and found a mostly intact human torso buried 30 cm below the surface.

In June 2017 human remains were found near Lough na Glack, County Monaghan, by Gardaí investigating his death.

See also 
 List of solved missing person cases

References

2010 deaths
2010s missing person cases
Criminals from Dublin (city)
Formerly missing people
Fratricides
Irish people convicted of rape
Male murder victims
Missing person cases in Ireland
People murdered in the Republic of Ireland
Year of birth missing